Anthony Joseph Bartirome (May 9, 1932 – June 22, 2018) was an American baseball player, coach and athletic trainer. He played first base for the Pittsburgh Pirates during the 1952 baseball season, after just one minor league season. He never appeared in another major league game following 1952, even though his professional career lasted through 1963. Prior to playing professionally, Bartirome was the star first baseman for a sandlot baseball team in Oakmont, Pennsylvania. He also went on to serve as a coach for the Atlanta Braves from 1986 to 1988. He was the team trainer for the Pittsburgh Pirates from 1967 to 1985.

Charlie Metro was his manager with the 1960 Denver Bears and offered this glowing praise: "Tony Bartirome was an absolute delight.  I had Bo Osborne as a first baseman, and Tony had been there the year before.  Tony was a good-fielding, little first baseman, not a very big guy.  He was a left-handed hitter and thrower and was one of the most positive guys I've ever seen.  I kept him on the ball club because he was great for the club.  I regret one thing—I wanted to play him at shortstop or second base, because he was a left-hander, and I wanted to shake up things.  I was hoping one of my infielders would catch a cold sometime so I could put him in there.  I'd come in from the coaching box line when we were behind, and Tony would say, 'Don't worry, Skip.  A couple of hits, a couple of bases on balls and a choke-up play, and we got 4 runs.  We'll get them.'  That was his idea of a rally!  He became a fine trainer with the Pittsburgh Pirates for many years.  If I could pattern a ball club with guys as positive as he was, I think I'd send a wire to the other managers: 'Forget first place.'  What a guy to have on a club!"

Bartirome died on June 22, 2018, at the age of 86.

References

Further reading

Articles

 Hernon, Jack. "Two Hill District Boys Impress Bill Meyer: Bartirome, Del Greco Stand Out At Pirate Training School in Leland, Fla.". The Pittsburgh Post-Gazette. October 19, 1951.
 Jordan, Jimmy. "Native Pittsburghers at Forbes Field? Pair of Pittsburgh Youngsters May Be Big Help to Pirates Soon". The Pittsburgh Press. November 13, 1951.
 "City Youths Fine Buc Prospects: Rickey's High On Bartirome, Del Greco". The Pittsburgh Press. February 27, 1952.
 Biederman, Les. "The Scoreboard". The Pittsburgh Press. April 16, 1952.
 Biederman, Les. "Bartirome Hurt As Bucs Lose 10th; Rookie Out For Week With Injured Ankle". The Pittsburgh Press. April 30, 1952.
 Hernon, Jack. "Roamin' Around: The Weekly Notebook". The Pittsburgh Post-Gazette. May 10, 1952.
 Associated Press. "Loes, Bartirome Are Top Rookies". The Rome News Tribune. June 5, 1952.
 "Mayor Lawrence Goes To Bat For Del Greco And Bartirome". The Pittsburgh Press. June 17, 1952.
 Abrams, Al. "Sidelights on Sports: Monday Morning's Sports Wash". The Pittsburgh Post-Gazette. August 4, 1952.
 "Del Greco, Bartirome To Be Given Bonds". The Pittsburgh Post-Gazette. August 5, 1952.
 Biederman, Les. "Neccai Dazzles In Second Showing; Bucs Shatter Early—Lose 10–4 to Reds". The Pittsburgh Press. August 12, 1952. 
 Kiner, Ralph. "Kiner's Liners". The Pittsburgh Press. September 28, 1952. 
 "Groat Tells Bucs He's Army Bound; Bartirome, Neccai Inducted Today". The Pittsburgh Press. January 11, 1953.
 "Bartirome Reinstated". The Pittsburgh Post-Gazette. January 13, 1955.
 Abrams, Al. "Sidelights On Sports: 'One Arm' Wants Regular Job". The Pittsburgh Post-Gazette. January 20, 1955.
 Feeney, Charley. "Bartirome Finds His Niche as Trainer; It's a Long Trip From Greensburg to Pirate Roster". The Pittsburgh Post-Gazette. March 13, 1967. 
 Biederman, Les. "The Scoreboard; Gentile Plans To Make Most Of Last Chance; New Base For Bartirome". The Pittsburgh Press. March 20, 1967. 
 Richman, Milton (UPI). "Today's Sports Parade: This Baseball Trainer Is In the Record Book". The Lexington Dispatch. June 10, 1968.
 Rappaport, Ken. "Trainer Gives Pirates Boost". The Ocala Star-Banner. August 19, 1973.
 UPI. "Playmates Made It to the Majors". The Wilmington Star-News. July 27, 1974.
 Isphording, Bruce. "Bartirome Endured '52 Pirate Blues". The Sarasota Journal. March 10, 1976. pp. 1-B and 5-B.
 Atwood, Charlie. "St. Stephens Loses 75–49". The St. Petersburg Times. December 11, 1976.
 Musick, Phil. "Tanner, Bucs Play Familiar Tune". The Pittsburgh Post-Gazette. March 6, 1979. 
 Livingston, Pat. "Scoreboard: Achilles Injury: Hit of Myth?". The Pittsburgh Press. May 22, 1981.
 Gurney, Jack. "Bartirome More Than a Trainer". The Sarasota Herald-Tribune. March 4, 1982.
 Hertzel, Bob. "Orsulak Makes Big-League Grade in Pirates' Win". The Pittsburgh Press. July 12, 1985. 
 "Braves Hire Three Coaches". The Ocala Star-Banner. October 15, 1985.
 Dunn, Jimmy. "Ex-Pirates Have Been Teammates for Life". The Pittsburgh Post-Gazette. July 30, 1997. pp. S-13 and S-14.
 "Other Deaths: Rose Bartirome". The Pittsburgh Post-Gazette. December 21, 2001.

Books
 Wagenheim, Kal (1973). . New York, NY: Praeger Publishers. pp. 140–146.
 O'Brien, Jim (1994). Remember Roberto. Pittsburgh, PA: James P. O'Brien Publishing. pp. 88–94. .

External links

1932 births
2018 deaths
Baseball coaches from Pennsylvania
Baseball players from Pittsburgh
Atlanta Braves coaches
Burlington-Graham Pirates players
Columbus Jets players
Denver Bears players
Hollywood Stars players
Hutchinson Elks players
Kinston Eagles players
Little Rock Travelers players
Louisville Colonels players
Macon Peaches players
Major League Baseball first basemen
Major League Baseball trainers
New Orleans Pelicans (baseball) players
Pittsburgh Pirates players
Portland Beavers players
Williamsport Grays players
Sportspeople from Pittsburgh
American expatriate baseball players in Panama